The Three-anti Campaign (1951) and Five-anti Campaign (1952) were reform movements originally issued by Mao Zedong a few years after the founding of the People's Republic of China in an effort to rid Chinese cities of corruption and enemies of the state. The result turned into a series of campaigns that consolidated Mao's power base by targeting political opponents and capitalists, especially wealthy capitalists. The campaigns negatively impacted the economy of big cities such as Shanghai, Tianjin and Chongqing, forcing many businessmen to commit suicide. In Shanghai alone, from January 25 to April 1, 1952, at least 876 people committed suicide.

The Three-anti campaign

The Three-anti Campaign was launched in Manchuria at the end of 1951.  It was aimed at members within the Chinese Communist Party, former Kuomintang members and bureaucratic officials who were not party members.

The 3 antis imposed were:
 corruption
 waste
 bureaucracy

The Five-anti campaign
The Five-anti campaign was launched in January 1952.  It was designed to target the capitalist class.  The Communist party set a very vague guideline of who could be charged, and it became an all out war against the bourgeoisie in China.  Deng Xiaoping warned the people "not to be corrupted by capitalist thinking".

The 5 antis imposed were:
 bribery
 theft of state property 
 tax evasion
 cheating on government contracts
 stealing state economic intelligence.

An estimated 20,000 cadres and 6,000 trained workers began spying on the business affairs of fellow citizens.  The media encouraged compliance with the government policies.  Up to 15,000 trained propagandists were working in Shanghai by late 1951.  By February 1952, parades of anti-Capitalist activists went door-to-door to visit business leaders.  It created immense psychological pressure.  Shanghai wards were set up to receive criticism letters from any employees.  As many as 18,000 letters came in the first week of February 1952, and 210,000 came in by the end of the first month.  Cadres of party members would join in on the attack.  Some big companies would voluntarily make 1,000 confessions a day to try to protect themselves from the government.  A prime example was the Dahua copper company owner who originally over-confessed by claiming to have illegally obtained 50 million yuan.  His employees continued to criticize the owner for greater crime until he reconfessed to having obtained 2 billion yuan.

Aftermath
The victims of the antis campaigns were mostly terrified and humiliated; some were killed, and others were sent to labor camps. Mao evaluated the situation, saying that "we must probably execute 10,000 to several tens of thousands of embezzlers nationwide before we can solve the problem." And all found guilty of their confessed or unconfessed crimes were made to pay fines to the government. There were hundreds of thousands of suicides (though it is debatable whether many of these were voluntary) that were a direct result of these campaigns.

Eventually the Communist Party revealed that it would no longer protect private business, and that Chinese capitalists would receive treatment no better than foreign. The Korean War initially provided opportunities in Northern China, giving rise to a new class of capitalists, many of whom would be prosecuted under the Marxist policies of the Communist Party. Many of these people eventually borrowed money from the government to pay off government fines, creating a complex financial pattern.  A series of anti campaigns were launched by the Chinese government in the following years.

See also
 List of campaigns of the Chinese Communist Party
Gu Zhun
 Economy of China

References

Economic history of the People's Republic of China
Corruption in China
Campaigns of the Chinese Communist Party
Maoist terminology
Maoist China
Political and cultural purges
Political repression in China